Bernd Jochen Hilberath (born 29 June 1948, Bingen am Rhein, Germany) is a German Roman Catholic theologian.

Life
From 1967 to 1972, Hilberath studied philosophy and Roman Catholic theology at the University of Mainz and at the Ludwig Maximilian University of Munich. From 1985 to 1989 he was professor of dogmatic theology and ecumenical theology at the University of Mainz. From 1989 to 1992 Hilberath was professor of dogmatic theology and fundamental theology at the Catholic University of Mainz. Since March 1992 he has been Professor of Dogmatic Theology and History of Economic Thought at the Faculty of Catholic Theology at the University of Tübingen. Hilberath is married and has four children.

Bibliography

Book publications

As author
 Bei den Menschen sein. Die letzte Chance für die Kirche, Ostfildern 2013, . 
 Auf das Vor-Zeichen kommt es an. Vom Grund christlicher Hoffnung, Ostfildern 2012, .
 (together with ), Kommunikative Theologie. Grundlagen - Erfahrungen - Klärungen (Communicative Theology, Volume 15), Ostfildern 2012,  und .
 Jetzt ist die Zeit, Matthias-Grünewald-Verlag, Ostfildern 2010     
 Orientalium ecclesiarum, Herder Verlag, Freiburg im Breisgau 2009
 Ökumene des Lebens als Herausforderung der wissenschaftlichen Theologie, Lembeck, Frankfurt am Main 2008     
 Von der Communio zur kommunikativen Theologie, Berlin 2008     
 Theologie im Gespräch, Lembeck, Frankfurt am Main 2006
 together with Matthias Scharer, Kommunikative Theologie. Eine Grundlegung (Communicative Theology, Volume 1), Mainz 2002, . 
 Der dreieinige Gott und die Gemeinschaft der Menschen. Orientierungen zur christlichen Rede von Gott. Theodor Schneider zum 60. Geburtstag (Grünewald-Reihe), Mainz 1990, .
 Heiliger Geist - heilender Geist (Grünewald-Reihe), Mainz 1988, .
 Der Personbegriff der Trinitätstheologie in Rückfrage von Karl Rahner zu Tertullians "Adversus Praxean" (Innsbruck theologian studies, Volume 17), Innsbruck, Vienna 1986, (at the same time with Hochschulschrift Universität Mainz, Habilitations-Schrift, 1984/85), .
 Theologie zwischen Tradition und Kritik. Die philosophische Hermeneutik Hans-Georg Gadamers als Herausforderung des theolischen Selbstverständnisses (Themes and theses of theology) Düsseldorf 1978, (at the same time with Hochschulschrift, Universität Mainz, Fachbereich 01 - Kath. Theologie, Dissertation, 1977 under the title Fundamentaltheologie und Hermeneutik), .

As publisher
 (Ed., together with ): Herders Theologischer Kommentar zum Zweiten Vatikanischen Konzil. 5 Vols., Freiburg 2004/5, 
 (Ed., together with Clemens Mendonca): Begegnen statt importieren. Zum Verhältnis von Religion und Kultur. (= Festschrift zum 75. Geburtstag von Francis X. D'Sa) Ostfildern 2011, . 
 (Ed.): Wahrheit in Beziehung. Der dreieine Gott als Quelle und Orientierung menschlicher Kommunikation (Communicative Theology, Volume 4), Mainz 2003, .
 (Ed., together with Johannes Kohl, Jürgen Nikolay): Grenzgänge sind Entdeckungsreisen. Lebensraumorientierte Seelsorge und kommunikative Theologie im Dialog.  Projekte und Reflexionen. (Communicative Theology, Band 14) Ostfildern 2011, .

Contributions to collected works
 Pneumatologie. In: Theodor Schneider (Ed.): Handbuch der Dogmatik, 5th Edition Ostfildern 2013, und , Volume 1, Part Three, Leben aus dem Geist, Pages 445–554. 
 Gnadenlehre.
 Dialog - Communio - Kommunikation. Stationen meines theologischen Weges. In: Matthias Scharer (Ed.), Brad E. Hinze (Ed.), Bernd Jochen Hilberath (Ed.): Kommunikative Theologie: Zugänge - Auseinandersetzungen - Ausdifferenzierungen /Communicative Theology: Approaches - Discussions - Differentiation, (= Communicative Theology, Volume 14), LIT-Verlag, Münster- Hamburg-Berlin-Vienna-London-Zürich 2010, S. 10–20.

References

1948 births
Living people
People from Bingen am Rhein
German Roman Catholic theologians
Johannes Gutenberg University Mainz alumni
Ludwig Maximilian University of Munich alumni
Academic staff of Johannes Gutenberg University Mainz
Academic staff of the University of Tübingen